Elisa Randazzo is an American musician, songwriter and fashion designer who is based in California.  Although her contributions as a songwriter, singer and violinist have spanned many musical projects, Bruises and Butterflies is her first solo release.  It debuted on the Drag City label on May 18, 2010.  Two songs on this LP are a result of her collaboration with the influential, 1970s British folk singer/guitarist, Bridget St John. Randazzo is known for layered harmonies and string arrangements.

Elisa was born in New York to well-known songwriters, Victoria Pike and Teddy Randazzo. Her father wrote hit pop songs such as, "Goin' Out of My Head," "It's Gonna Take a Miracle," and "Hurt So Bad," which were recorded by a gamut of early pop legends, from Little Anthony and the Imperials, to The Zombies to Linda Ronstadt to Frank Sinatra, among others.  Her mother was also a prolific songwriter, writing psychedelic classics such as The Third Bardot's,  "I'm Five Years Ahead of My Time," (Nuggets collection). Elisa grew up in Nyack, NY, but spent a lot of time on the road with her parents.  She spent nursery school in Jamaica, where her father developed bands in a Kingston studio, as well as numerous stints in Las Vegas while her parents performed in lounges across from Elvis, among others.

Elisa received a rigorous liberal arts education at the Green Meadow Waldorf School in the New York suburb of Spring Valley.  The Steiner curriculum introduced her to the violin at the age of eight.  After graduating Green Meadow, Randazzo studied political science in Paris, France and then at New York's Columbia University.  After moving to Los Angeles, she met musician-artist Mayo Thompson, best known for his leadership of the avant-garde rock band, Red Krayola.  She played violin and sang with Red Krayola, touring the United States, Japan and Austria.  She also appears on four Red Krayola LPs (Drag City), including, 'Sighs Trapped By Liars,' which was recorded in 2007.  She has also guest appeared on many projects as a vocalists and/or violinist.

Appears on
First Tell Me Your Name (7", EP) Tugboat 3001-ad Little Mafia Records 1996
Hazel (LP) Red Krayola Drag City 1996
The Fakers & The Takers (7") Further Fierce Panda 1997
Fingerpainting (Album) ◄ (2 versions) Red Krayola Drag City 1999
Fingerpainting (LP) Red Krayola Drag City 1999
Fingerpainting (CD, Album) Red Krayola Drag City 1999
Don't Let the Bastards Get You Down: A Tribute to Kris Kristofferson Jackpine Social Club (CD) 2002
I Believe in the Spirit (CD single) Tim Burgess P.I.A.S. 2003
Fairechild (CD) Fairechild Spaceshed Records 2005
Sighs Trapped By Liars (CD, Album) Red Krayola Drag City 2007
Fingerpointing (CD, Album) Red Krayola Drag City 2008,
Pacific Dust (CD, Album) The Mother Hips Camera Records 2009
Bruises & Butterflies (CD, Album) Elisa Randazzo Drag City 2010
Doris & the Daggers (CD, Album) Spiral Stairs [[Nine Mile,[3] Domino (record label)]] 2017

References

1975 births
American folk musicians
Living people
Drag City (record label) artists
Songwriters from California
Musicians from New York (state)
People from Nyack, New York
Columbia University alumni
Songwriters from New York (state)